Pireh Sorkh-e Pain (also Romanized as Pīreh Sorkh-e Pā’īn; also known as Pir-i-Surkh, Pīr Sorkh, Pīr Sorkh-e Pā’īn, Pīr Sorkh Soflá, and Seyyed Laţīf) is a village in Bakesh-e Do Rural District, in the Central District of Mamasani County, Fars Province, Iran. At the 2006 census, its population was 20, in 4 families.

References 

Populated places in Mamasani County